The 2018 IFAF U-19 World Championship was an international American football tournament for junior teams (19 years and under) that took place at Mexico City from July 15 to July 22. This was the first time that Mexico hosted an IFAF World Junior Championship  competition.

Teams were split into higher and lower groups by seeding. Three teams from higher seeded group and one team from lower seeded group would advance to the semi-final. 
This would be the last world junior championship staged in the U19 age classification. The 2020 championship scheduled for the United States was cancelled by IFAF 3 March 2020 due to complications from the Coronavirus pandemic. The next scheduled world junior championship is a U20 competition hosted by Football Canada in Edmonton, Alberta in July 2024.

Participants and seeding
1. 
2. 
3. 
4. 
5. 
6.

Matches
Game 1

Game 2

Game 3

Game 4 (Placement game)

Game 5 (semifinal)

Game 6 (semifinal)

Game 7 (Fifth Place Game)

Game 8 (bronze-medal game)

Game 9 (gold-medal game)

References

External links
 

IFAF Junior World Cup
American football in Mexico
2018 in American football
International sports competitions hosted by Mexico
IFAF